Catocala abacta is a moth of the family Erebidae. It is found in Asia Minor.

Subspecies
Catocala abacta abacta
Catocala abacta irana Brandt, 1938 (Iran)

References

External links
Catocala abacta irana images

abacta
Moths of Asia
Moths described in 1900